Abalistes is a small triggerfish genus found in the Indo-Pacific and eastern Atlantic.

Species
There are currently 3 recognized species in this genus:
 Abalistes filamentosus Matsuura & Yoshino, 2004 
 Abalistes stellaris (Bloch & J. G. Schneider, 1801)
 Abalistes stellatus Anonymous, referred to Lacépède, 1798

References

Balistidae
Marine fish genera
Taxa named by David Starr Jordan
Taxa named by Alvin Seale